The RSh-12 is a Russian-made revolver chambered in 12.7×55mm STs-130.

It fires from the bottom chamber of the cylinder (like the Chiappa Rhino and Mateba Autorevolver) rather than the more common top chamber, and is chambered for the same ammunition as the ASh-12.7 battle rifle.

Variant

Military variant
 RSh-12: Chambered in 12.7×55mm.
 RSh-9: Chambered in 9x39mm.

Civilian variant
Originally introduced in 2020, by late 2021 these carbines are still in final stages of development, and there’s no firm information on their future availability and pricing.

 MTs-569: Chambered in 12.7×55mm .
 MTs-570: Chambered in 9x39mm.

Users

See also
 ASh-12.7
 Mateba Autorevolver
 Chiappa Rhino
 MP-412 REX
 Rifle-caliber handgun

References

External links
 Meet The RSh-12: The Most Powerful Revolver In The World is Russian 
 Штурмовой револьвер РШ-12 из Тулы 
 Most Powerful Revolver Pistol

Revolvers of Russia
12.7 mm firearms
KBP Instrument Design Bureau products